Shir Kuh (also Romanized as Shīr Kūh; also known as Shīrākūh and Shirkukh) is a village in Rahmatabad Rural District, Rahmatabad and Blukat District, Rudbar County, Gilan Province, Iran. At the 2006 census, its population was 577, in 182 families.

References 

Populated places in Rudbar County